Kadodara is a Suburban area and Municipality in the Surat City in the Indian state of Gujarat. Kadodra is a junction of NH 6 and NH8  HIGHWAY and kadodara is the middle way on Surat-Bardoli road. The civil agency of Kadodara. A boom in kadodara's real estate attracted many industrialists and due to its proximity to Surat. Many residential projects are under construction in Kadodara.

Kadodara is known for the famous hanumanji temple which is located nearby to the station.and also Residency project in bardoli road like Shri Niwas Green City society who cover more than 100 apartment like Shiv Residency,prince residency , opera , and also school named vidhya bharti high school. The nearest airport of kadodara is surat airport.

Demographics
 India census, Kadodara had a population of 14,819. Males constitute 68% of the population and females 32%. Kadodara has an average literacy rate of 68%, higher than the national average of 59.5%: male literacy is 77%, and female literacy is 50%. In Kadodara, 12% of the population is under 6 years of age.

See also 
List of tourist attractions in Surat

References

External links
al.com/surat/ Surat: The Dream City

Suburban area of Surat
Cities and towns in Surat district